John Augspurger Farm No. 2 is a historic building near Trenton, Ohio, listed on the National Register of Historic Places in 1984. The two-story, rectangular farmhouse represents part of the grouping of the Amish Mennonites' settlement buildings. It is designed in the I-house style in an Amish house type and was built between 1846 and 1853.

Historic uses 
Single Dwelling

Notes

External links
Ohio Historic Inventory

Houses on the National Register of Historic Places in Ohio
National Register of Historic Places in Butler County, Ohio
Houses in Butler County, Ohio